Neonatal ichthyosis–sclerosing cholangitis syndrome (also known as "NISCH syndrome" and "ichthyosis–sclerosing cholangitis syndrome") is a cutaneous condition which is characterized by hypotrichosis of the scalp, alopecia, ichthyosis and sclerosing cholangitis. Only 5 cases from 3 families worldwide have been described in medical literature. It caused by mutations in the Claudin 1 gene.

See also 
 Ichthyosis prematurity syndrome
 List of cutaneous conditions

References

External links 

Genodermatoses
Syndromes affecting the skin